An abscess in the psoas muscle of the abdomen may be caused by lumbar tuberculosis. Owing to the proximal attachments of the iliopsoas, such an abscess may drain inferiorly into the upper medial thigh and present as a swelling in the region. The sheath of the muscle arises from the lumbar vertebrae and the intervertebral discs between the vertebrae. The disc is more susceptible to infection, from tuberculosis and Salmonella discitis. The infection can spread into the psoas muscle sheath.

Treatment may involve drainage and antibiotics.

Additional images

See also
 Femoral hernia
 Transient synovitis

References

External links 

Muscular disorders
Peritoneum disorders